Linopodes is a genus of mites in the family Cocceupodidae. There are at least two described species in Linopodes.

Species
These two species belong to the genus Linopodes:
 Linopodes ambustus C.L.Koch, 1838 g
 Linopodes motatorius (Linnaeus, 1758) g
Data sources: i = ITIS, c = Catalogue of Life, g = GBIF, b = Bugguide.net

References

Further reading

External links

 

Trombidiformes